Kirder is a surname. Notable people with the surname include: 

Rafi Kirder (born 1980), Swiss musician
Sevan Kirder (born 1980), Swiss musician